Love Journey  is a 2019 Chinese television series directed by Mao Weining, starring Chen Xiao and Jing Tian with He Minghan and Qin Shan. Partly produced  by the Ministry of Public Security (China), the series is touted as the first "road-trip drama" in China. It started airing on Jiangsu TV and Zhejiang TV from April 20, 2019.

This series can be seen at : https://dramacool9.ca/drama/a-journey-to-meet-love.html

Synopsis 
A white-collar worker Li Xinyue uses a huge sum of money to buy the drawing "Baobei" from famed artist Chu Hongfei. This raises the attention of the police, who suspects that Li Xinyue is affiliated to a drug-trafficking organization they are investigating. They send Jin Xiaotian, an undercover cop, to follow her around. By a chance encounter, the two joins Chu Hongfei's son, Chu Hongjie, in his business project which takes them on a journey to Shangri-la, Li Xinyue's hometown. On the journey, Jin Xiaotian and Li Xinyue falls in love with each other but due to his identity as an undercover cop, Jin Xiaotian is reluctant to confess. However, Li Xinyue finds out the truth when she is kidnapped by the drug trafficking organization in the midst of protecting the drawing "Baobei".

Cast

Main
Chen Xiao as Jin Xiaotian (Sky) 
An undercover cop working in the Narcotics police department. He appears frivolous, but is ambitious and passionate about his job. He is a jack-of-all-trades, and often uses unpredictable methods in solving crimes. The "problem solver" of the "Love Journey" team.  
Jing Tian as Li Xinyue (Lily) 
An ordinary white-collar worker. She is intelligent, brave and tenacious. Her mission is to find out the truth about her father's death 20 years ago, and prove to the world that her father is the real artist of "Baobei". The "route planner"  of the "Love Journey" team. 
He Minghan as Chu Zhe Han (Kevin)
A second-generation heir who chases his dreams without fear. Son of Chu Hongfei. Despite his wealthy background, he is humble and willing to work hard. The leader of the  "Love Journey" team. 
Qin Shan as Sheng Xia
An internet broadcaster who is bright and full of energy. The tour guide of the "Love Journey" team.

Supporting 
Ding Yongdai as Lao Feng
Captain of the Narcotics police department. Jin Xiaotian's superior and mentor. 
Liu Wei as Mr. Ouyang 
Leader of a drug trafficking squad.
Li Jing as Hu Zhihui
Subordinate of Mr. Ouyang. 
Wang Ce as Chu Hongfei
A painter who became famous through the drawing "Baobei" and created his own "Snow Mountain Painting" sect. Chu Hongjie's father. 
Liu Yijun as Li Qifeng
Li Xinyue's father. Chu Hongfei's senior. The real artist of "Baobei". 
Na Wei as Mr. Zhao
Boss of a loan and credits company. 
Guan Xinjing as Ah Pei
Chu Hongjie's assistant. The "driver" of the Love Journey team. 
Li Ying as Chen Zhengqian
Chu Hongfei's wife and Chu Hongjie's mother.

Production
The drama began filming in April 2018 and wrapped up filming in July 2018. Filming took place in several locations across China, such as Wuxi, Suzhou, Shanghai, Dali and Shangri-La City.

Soundtrack

Reception
The drama received positive reviews. It was praised for seamlessly weaving the different genres together, providing a well-organized storyline and appropriate pacing of the story (which alternates between tense and relax). It was also praised for its unique theme of showcasing modern youths' love using a road-trip theme.

Ratings 

 Highest ratings are marked in red, lowest ratings are marked in blue

Awards and nominations

References 

Zhejiang Television original programming
Jiangsu Television original programming
2019 Chinese television series debuts
2019 Chinese television series endings
Chinese romance television series
Thriller television series